Mathilda Emma Paradeiser (born September 5, 1995) is a Swedish actress. Mathilda played the lead role in the 2011 award winning Swedish movie Apflickorna. She has also acted in Sveriges Television's (Re)Volt and in 2013 filmed "Frankenstein" in Chicago playing the role of Ingrid.

In 2014, Mathilda attended a film festival in Argentina and also graduated from drama school in Stockholm.

In 2017, Mathilda returned to television with a role in the dramaseries Vår tid är nu which is broadcast on SVT.

Filmography

TV

Radio

References

External links

1995 births
Living people
Swedish actresses